Vicissitude was launched at Shields in 1830. She traded across the Atlantic but then was wrecked in 1836 in the Maldive Islands.

Career
Vicissitude entered Lloyd's Register in 1830 with C. Brown, master and owner, and trade London–Quebec. In 1832 her trade became London–Porto Bello. Lloyd's Register for 1835 showed her master changing to Snell and her trade to London–Mauritius.

Loss
Vicissitude, Snell, master was wrecked 10 May 1836 at ihavandhippolhu-fulu  (Haa Alif Atoll) in the Maldive Islands. She was on a voyage from Mauritius to Calcutta, India. Her crew and cargo were saved.

Lloyd's Register for 1836 has the annotation "LOST" by her name.

The Sultan accepted some presents as marks of friendship, but declined any payment, though the Government made a liberal offer.

Citations

References
 

1830 ships
Age of Sail merchant ships of England
Maritime incidents in May 1836